Liangmai Naga may refer to:
 Liangmai Naga people (Liangmai Nagas) - Liangmai people
 Liangmai Naga language - Liangmai language